This is intended to be a complete list of the properties and districts on the National Register of Historic Places in Fremont County, Iowa, United States. Latitude and longitude coordinates are provided for many National Register properties and districts; these locations may be seen together in a map.

There are 9 properties and districts listed on the National Register in the county, including one National Historic Landmark.

|}

See also

 List of National Historic Landmarks in Iowa
 National Register of Historic Places listings in Iowa
 Listings in neighboring counties: Atchison (MO), Cass (NE), Mills, Otoe (NE), Page

References

Fremont
Buildings and structures in Fremont County, Iowa